Ananth Nag is an Indian actor, who has appeared in Tamil film industry also acted in Malayalam language films. After making his acting debut in the Tamil version of Alphonse Putharen's Neram (2013), he has gone on to act in films including Amara Kaaviyam (2014) and Premam

Career
Ananth Nag who was Born and Brought from Chennai in a Telugu Family, graduated with a bachelor's degree from Sri Venkateswara College of Engineering and started out working as a software engineer. His strong inclination towards arts led him pursue a cinematography course at Mindscreen Film Institute run by Rajiv Menon, and followed it up by photography lessons from Dinesh Kumble. Ananth continued to work as an assistant cinematographer for films and short films and met director Alphonse Putharen through his work. He subsequently went on to feature in a cameo role in Putharen's first film Neram (2013) as well as a series of short films titled Enna Solla Pogirai, Enna Solla Varenna and Jai Jakkama, where Ananth starred as a protagonist.

Ananth then portrayed the antagonist in Amara Kaaviyam (2014), appearing as a school boy who vies for the attention of his friend's lover. Putharen cast him in Premam (2015) as Arivazhagan, the cousin of Sai Pallavi's character, while he was later seen as Sasikumar's brother in Vetrivel (2016). He made his lead debut with July Kaatril'' (2019).

Early and personal life
Ananth Nag was born to a Telugu Family in Chennai. He completed his schooling At SBOA Matriculation. On 30 June 2017 he married Urshila. The couple have a son Named Sachin who was born in 2018.

Filmography

References

Living people
Male actors in Tamil cinema
21st-century Indian male actors
Indian male film actors
Tamil male actors
Year of birth missing (living people)
Place of birth missing (living people)